Grohotișul River may refer to:

 Grohotișul, a name for the upper course of the river Turcu in Brașov County
 Grohotișul River (Boia Mare)